Frederick Forrest Peabody (July 6, 1859 – February 23, 1927) was a prominent citizen of Santa Barbara, California, in the early twentieth century. As chairman of the local Board of Education, he oversaw the construction of Santa Barbara High School, and as a philanthropist he contributed generously to the rebuilding of the city after the 1925 earthquake.

Life
He was born in Northfield, Vermont, where he acquired a minimal formal education, entering business at the age of 17.

Described often as a self-made man, he worked his way up to become President of Cluett, Peabody and Co. of Troy, New York, a post he held for ten years. He was instrumental in marketing the popular Arrow brand shirts and collars. In his later life he gave generously to causes that helped the less fortunate. He donated the Peabody Stadium to Santa Barbara High School and the land for the Peabody Charter School.

Marriages
Peabody wed Sarah Blanche Griffith of Wisconsin on January 10, 1882, and married, secondly, to Kathleen Burke of London on April 5, 1920.

Affiliations
 Bankers Club of New York City
 Bohemian Club of San Francisco
 University Club of Santa Barbara
 La Cumbre Country Club
 Montecito Country Club

References

External links
 

1859 births
1927 deaths
Businesspeople from California
People from Santa Barbara, California